This page lists the World Best Year Performance in the year 2006 in both the men's and the women's hammer throw. One of the main event during this season were the 2006 European Athletics Championships in Gothenburg, Sweden, where the final of the men's competition was held on Saturday August 12, 2006. The women had their final four days earlier, on Tuesday August 8, 2006.

Men

Records

2006 World Year Ranking

Women

Records

2006 World Year Ranking

References
IAAF
tilastopaja
apulanta
apulanta
hammerthrow.wz

2006
Hammer Throw Year Ranking, 2006